Lamprocyphus augustus is a species of the true weevil family.

Description 

Photonic crystals
The iridescent green with golden reflections is a structural colour. It is created by the photonic crystal structure of its chitin scales.

Distribution 
This species occurs in Brazil and Argentina.

References 

 Universal Biological Indexer
 Encyclopedia of Life
 Data.gbif
 Catalogue of Life

External links 
 Adamantine Word Press
 Brazilian Beetles Hold Key to Faster Computers
 Insecte

augustus
Entiminae